For the Eurovision Song Contest 1978, Sweden held a national final called Melodifestivalen 1978. The winner and representative was "Det blir alltid värre framåt natten", sung by Björn Skifs, and written and composed by Peter Himmelstrand.

Before Eurovision

Melodifestivalen 1978 
Melodifestivalen 1978 was the selection for the 18th song to represent Sweden at the Eurovision Song Contest. It was the 17th time that this system of picking a song had been used. 58 songs were submitted to SVT for the competition. The final was held in the Cirkus in Stockholm on 11 February 1978, presented by Ulf Elfving and broadcast on TV1 but was not broadcast on radio. The songs were not performed live, instead the performances were recorded the afternoon before, and inter-mingled with live pieces from the venue. There was a tie in the voting, and each regional jury was asked to award one point to their favourite song of "Det blir alltid värre framåt natten" and "Miss Decibel". The former won by eight votes to three.

Voting

At Eurovision
Björn Skifs intended to cause controversy by singing in English, which could have disqualified him. Instead, he sang a part of the song in nonsense words, but only Swedes knew the words were wrong. He finished 14th (out of 20).

Voting

References

External links
TV broadcastings at SVT's open archive

1978
Countries in the Eurovision Song Contest 1978
1978
Eurovision
Eurovision